Come By Chance is a locality in the Pilliga district of northern New South Wales, Australia. At the 2006 census, Come By Chance had a population of 187. By the time of the 2016 census this had fallen to 125.

History 
George and William Colless purchased a sheep station in the area in 1862, naming it "Come by Chance" to reflect their surprise at being able to make such a purchase in this area. The town was later named after this property. It has frequently been noted on lists of unusual place names.

Events 
Each year it attracts several thousand spectators to the Come-By-Chance Picnic Race Meeting.

In popular culture 
The town features in Banjo Paterson's wistful ballad Come-by-Chance:

But my languid mood forsook me, when I found a name that took me,Quite by chance I came across it — `Come-by-Chance' was what I read;No location was assigned it, not a thing to help one find it,Just an N which stood for northward, and the rest was all unsaid.

References

External links
 Come-by-Chance - e-text of ballad

Towns in New South Wales
Walgett Shire